The year 1893 in science and technology involved some significant events, listed below.

Biology
 July 11 – Kōkichi Mikimoto, in Japan, develops the method to seed and grow cultured pearls.
 Henry Luke Bolley discovers a method of treating smut with formaldehyde.

Chemistry
 Hans Goldschmidt discovers the thermite reaction.
 Nagai Nagayoshi synthesizes methamphetamine from ephedrine.
 Alfred Werner discovers the octahedral structure of cobalt complexes, thus establishing the field of coordination chemistry.

Earth sciences
 Eduard Suess postulates the former existence of the Tethys Sea.

Exploration
 Mary Kingsley lands in Sierra Leone on the first of her journeys through Africa in the interests of anthropology and natural history.

Mathematics
 J. J. Sylvester poses what becomes known as the Sylvester–Gallai theorem in geometry.
 Geometric Exercises in Paper Folding by T. Sundara Row is first published in Madras.

Medicine
 July 9 – Daniel H. Williams completes the first successful open heart surgery.
 October 5 – Johns Hopkins Medical School opens in the United States.
 Emil Kraepelin introduces the concept of dementia praecox in the classification of mental disorders, distinguishing it from mood disorder in his Lehrbuch der Psychiatrie (4th edition).
 Ádám Politzer describes otosclerosis for the first time.
 Vladimir Bekhterev describes Ankylosing spondylitis.

Physics
 Wilhelm Wien formulates Wien's displacement law.

Technology
 January 2 – Webb C. Ball introduces railroad chronometers which become the general railroad timepiece standards in North America.
 February 1 – Thomas Edison finishes construction of the first motion picture studio in West Orange, New Jersey.
 February 11 – János Csonka and Donát Bánki apply for a patent for the carburetor in Hungary.
 February 23 – Rudolf Diesel receives a patent for the diesel engine. In this year he also publishes his treatise Theorie und Konstruktion eines rationellen Wärmemotors zum Ersatz der Dampfmaschine und der heute bekannten Verbrennungsmotoren.
 February 28 – Edward Goodrich Acheson patents the method for making the abrasive silicon carbide powder.
 May 9 – Edison's 1½ inch system of Kinetoscope is first demonstrated in public at the Brooklyn Institute.
 May – William Scherzer (dies July 20, 1893) files a patent for his design of rolling lift bridge.
 June 21 – The first Ferris Wheel opens to the public at the World's Columbian Exposition in Chicago.
 July 12 – Prototype of Diesel's Motor 250/400 (150/400) completed; first run August 10 (on petrol).
 July 25 – Completion of the Corinth Canal in Greece.
 August 17 – Wilhelm Maybach patents the spray nozzle carburetor in France.
 Refinery for Pacific Coast Borax Company in Alameda, California, designed by Ernest L. Ransome, is the first major reinforced concrete building in the United States.

Awards
 Copley Medal: George Gabriel Stokes
 Wollaston Medal for Geology: Nevil Story Maskelyne

Births
 February 3 – Gaston Julia (died 1978), French mathematician.
 April 29 – Harold Urey (died 1981), American winner of the Nobel Prize in Chemistry.
 April 30 – Roy Chadwick (died 1947), English aircraft designer.
 June 13 – Alan A. Griffith (died 1963), English stress engineer.
 August 5 – Sydney Camm (died 1966), English aircraft designer.
 August 15 – Leslie Comrie (died 1950), New Zealand astronomer and computing pioneer.
 August 24 – Haim Ernst Wertheimer (died 1978), German Jewish biochemist.
 August 25 – Henry Trendley Dean (died 1962), American dental researcher.
 September 16 – Albert Szent-Györgyi (died 1986), Hungarian physiologist, winner of the Nobel Prize in Physiology or Medicine.
 October 23 – Ernst Öpik (died 1985), Estonian astronomer and astrophysicist.
 November 3 – Edward Adelbert Doisy (died 1986), American biochemist, winner of the Nobel Prize in Physiology or Medicine.
 December – Eugène Gabritschevsky (died 1979), Russian biologist and artist.

Deaths
 January 2 – John Obadiah Westwood (born 1805), English entomologist.
 January 7 – Jožef Stefan (born 1835), Slovenian physicist and mathematician.
 March 3 – Orlando Whistlecraft (died 1810), English meteorologist.
 August 16 – Jean-Martin Charcot (born 1825), French neurologist.
 September 1 – Leonard Jenyns (born 1800), English natural historian.
 November 6 - Justin Benoît, (born 1813) French surgeon and anatomist
 December 4 – John Tyndall (born 1820), British physicist.
 December 6 – Rudolf Wolf (born 1816), Swiss astronomer.
 December 25 – Marie Durocher (born 1809), Brazilian obstetrician and physician.
 December 28 – Richard Spruce (born 1817), English botanist.

References

 
19th century in science
1890s in science